Matthew Steytler (5 June 1895 – 28 April 1977) was a South African long-distance runner. He competed in the marathon at the 1928 Summer Olympics.

References

1895 births
1977 deaths
Athletes (track and field) at the 1928 Summer Olympics
South African male long-distance runners
South African male marathon runners
Olympic athletes of South Africa
People from Vryheid